María A. Marcano de León is a Puerto Rican government official. She served as the interim Secretary of State of Puerto Rico from August 4, 2019, to December 19, 2019, following the resignation of Luis Rivera Marín. Marcano was previously the deputy director of the Puerto Rico Department of State.

References 

|-

Living people
Members of the 17th Cabinet of Puerto Rico
Puerto Rican women in politics
Secretaries of State of Puerto Rico
Year of birth missing (living people)